Alvin Kenneth Hellerstein (born December 28, 1933) is a senior United States district judge of the United States District Court for the Southern District of New York who has presided over several high-profile cases, including the Harvey Weinstein trial.

Education and career

Hellerstein was born in New York City, New York, to Rose and Max Hellerstein, and is an Orthodox Jew. He attended the Bronx High School of Science, graduating in 1950. He received a Bachelor of Arts degree from Columbia College in 1954. He received a Juris Doctor from Columbia Law School in 1956, and was editor of the Columbia Law Review. He was a law clerk for Judge Edmund Palmieri of the United States District Court for the Southern District of New York from 1956 to 1957.

He was in the United States Army, JAG Corps, as a first lieutenant from 1957 to 1960. Hellerstein was in the private practice of law, making partner in 1969 and ultimately as co-head of the litigation department of Stroock & Stroock & Lavan LLP, in New York City from 1960 to 1998. He has been President and Chairman of the Board of Jewish Education.

Federal judicial service 

Hellerstein was nominated by President Bill Clinton to be a United States district judge of the United States District Court for the Southern District of New York on May 15, 1998, to a seat vacated by Louis L. Stanton. He was confirmed by the United States Senate on October 21, 1998, and received his commission on October 22, 1998. He took senior status on January 30, 2011.

World Trade Center

In 2003, Hellerstein agreed to hear a consolidated master case against three airlines, ICTS International NV, and Pinkerton's airport security firms, the World Trade Center owners, and Boeing Co., the aircraft manufacturer. The case was brought by people injured in the 9-11 attacks, representatives of those who died, and entities that suffered property damage. In September 2004, just before the three-year statute of limitations expired, the insurers for the World Trade Center filed suit against American Airlines, United Airlines, and Pinkerton's airport security firm, alleging their negligence allowed the planes to be hijacked.

On January 12, 2006, Hellerstein dismissed the last remaining property-damage claim against New York City, while leaving pending several other suits against other parties, among them the Port Authority of New York and New Jersey.  According to Reuters, "[s]ix insurers sought repayment from the city for expenses arising from the collapse of a 47-story office building near the Twin Towers"; Hellerstein ruled New York had sovereign immunity.

The World Trade Center first responders (e.g., police and fire fighters) and the city conflicted with each other over the issue of payments for health costs of survivors among the first responders. On October 17, 2006, Hellerstein rejected New York City's motion to dismiss lawsuits that requested health payments to the first responders.

Hellerstein, on July 7, 2008, ruled that "the city is not required to re-sift through debris from ground zero in search of bits of human remains and remove it to a space where a cemetery might be built (thereby leaving the material from ground zero at Fresh Kills landfills). Plaintiffs have no property right in an undifferentiated, unidentifiable mass of dirt that may or may not contain the remains of plaintiffs' loved ones. Not every wrong can be addressed through the judicial process." Hellerstein urged the city to build a memorial and nature reserve at the site. Victims' families' counsel Norman Siegel criticized the ruling: "We are not prepared to leave hundreds of human remains of 9/11 victims on top of a garbage dump as their final resting place."

U.S. military detainees 
On December 20, 2004, Hellerstein said he would deny a government request to delay a review of whether certain Central Intelligence Agency internal files related to Iraq should be made public. On June 3, 2005, Hellerstein ordered the government to release four videos from Abu Ghraib prison and dozens of photographs from the same collection as photos that touched off the Iraqi prisoner abuse scandal a year prior. Hellerstein said the 144 pictures and videos could be turned over in redacted form to protect the victims' identities. The judge ordered the release after he viewed eight of the photos. They were given to the Army by a military policeman assigned to Abu Ghraib. On September 29, 2005, in ACLU v. Department of Defense, Hellerstein ordered the release of 87 more photographs and videotapes. In January and September 2017, Hellerstein ordered the release of additional government documents, including those referred to in the Senate torture report.

"Hope" poster matter 
Hellerstein presided over the Barack Obama "Hope" poster case.  Shepard Fairey, the artist behind the poster, sued the Associated Press. He sought to establish that his Hope poster did not infringe the AP's copyright of a shot taken by AP freelancer Mannie Garcia. The AP countersued, accusing Fairey of infringement. When Fairey finally admitted to his attempted cover up, Hellerstein allowed Fairey's original counsel to withdraw. In January 2011, the AP and Shepard Fairey settled out of court.

Harvey Weinstein trial 
Hellerstein presided over the Harvey Weinstein case. In April 2019, Hellerstein eliminated 17 claims from the case, but allowed the case to proceed to trial.

Michael Cohen prison release 
On July 23, 2020, Hellerstein granted a temporary restraining order in favor of President Donald Trump's former attorney Michael Cohen, ordering that Cohen be released from prison into home confinement. Cohen had argued that prison officials were preventing his transfer to home confinement out of retaliation for Cohen's refusal to agree not to write a book or contact the media while in home confinement.

David Hu Ponzi Scheme case 
In April 2022, Alvin Hellerstein sentenced David Hu of IIG Capital to 12 years in prison for fraud, stealing more than $100 million of client's money, running a Ponzi scheme, falsifying financial documents (cooking the book), lying to auditors, and other financial crimes.

See also
 List of Jewish American jurists

References

External links

Alvin K. Hellerstein (October 2013). "The Influence of a Jewish Education and Jewish Values on a Jewish Judge," Touro Law Review.

1933 births
Living people
American Orthodox Jews
The Bronx High School of Science alumni
Columbia Law School alumni
Law clerks
United States Army officers
Judges of the United States District Court for the Southern District of New York
Lawyers from New York City
United States district court judges appointed by Bill Clinton
20th-century American judges
21st-century American judges
Columbia College (New York) alumni